Martina Hingis was the defending champion, and successfully defended her title, defeating Lisa Raymond in the final 6–4, 6–2.

Seeds
A champion seed is indicated in bold text while text in italics indicates the round in which that seed was eliminated. The top four seeds received a bye to the second round.

  Martina Hingis (champion)
  Jana Novotná (second round)
  Iva Majoli (second round)
  Lindsay Davenport (second round)
  Amanda Coetzer (semifinals)
  Anke Huber (first round)
 n/a
  Irina Spîrlea (semifinals)

Draw

Final

Section 1

Section 2

External links
 1997 Porsche Tennis Grand Prix Draw

Porsche Tennis Grand Prix
1997 WTA Tour